
K'ayrani Quta (Aymara k'ayra frog, quta lake, -ni a suffix to indicate ownership, "the lake with a frog (or frogs)", also spelled Kairani Kkota) is a lake west of the Apolobamba mountain range in the Andes of Bolivia. It is situated in the La Paz Department, Franz Tamayo Province, Pelechuco Municipality.

References 

Lakes of La Paz Department (Bolivia)